P. intermedia  may refer to:
 Pachyaena intermedia, an extinct mammal species in the genus Pachyaena
 Pareuxesta intermedia, a picture-winged fly species
 Pavetta intermedia, a plant species found in the Democratic Republic of the Congo and Uganda
 Pearcea intermedia, a threatened plant species from Ecuador
 Pipreola intermedia, the Band-tailed Fruiteater, a bird species found in Bolivia and Peru
 Plebeia intermedia, a stingless bee species in the genus Plebeia
 Potentilla intermedia, a species of plant in the Potentilla (cinquefoils) genus
 Prevotella intermedia, a gram-negative anaerobic pathogen bacterium species involved in periodontal infections
 Psittacula intermedia, the Intermediate Parakeet or Rothschild's Parakeet, a kind of parakeet reported from the sub-Himalayan region of India

Synonyms
 Pachypasa intermedia, a synonym for Pachypasa limosa, a moth species found in southern France, the Iberian Peninsula and North Africa
 Peniophora intermedia, a synonym for Lopharia crassa, a plant pathogen species

See also
 Intermedia (disambiguation)